Aldania is a butterfly genus of the Limenitidinae. The genus is confined to the temperate East Palearctic. Aldania is closely related to Neptis.

Species
Aldania deliquata (Stichel, 1909) Transbaikalia, Amur, Ussuri, Northeast China, Korea. 
Aldania ilos Frühstorfer, 1909 Northeast China, Amur, Ussuri, West China, Taiwan
Aldania imitans (Oberthür, 1897) Aldania Mimic - Yunnan
Aldania raddei (Bremer, 1861) Amur, Ussuri
Aldania themis (Leech, 1890) Ussuri, China, Korea
Aldania thisbe (Ménétries, 1859) 
Aldania yunnana (Oberthür, 1906) Yunnan

References

Tuzov VK, Bogdanov PV, Devyatkin AL, Kaabak LV, Korolev VA, Murzin VS, Samodurov GD, and Tarasov EA. 1997. Guide to the butterflies of Russia and adjacent territories (Lepidoptera, Rhopalocera). Pensoft, Sofia.
"Aldania Moore, [1896]" at Markku Savela's Lepidoptera and Some Other Life Forms

Limenitidinae
Nymphalidae genera
Taxa named by Frederic Moore